Harry Ely (August 13, 1868 – May 11, 1925)  was an American professional baseball player who played for the Baltimore Orioles in 1892.

External links

Major League Baseball pitchers
Baltimore Orioles (NL) players
19th-century baseball players
Allentown Colts players
Hazleton Barons players
Philadelphia Colts players
Allentown Goobers players
Lancaster Chicks players
York White Roses players
1868 births
1925 deaths